Peggy Bennett (born July 3, 1958) is an American politician serving in the Minnesota House of Representatives since 2015. A member of the Republican Party of Minnesota, Bennett represents District 23A in southern Minnesota, which includes the city of Albert Lea and parts of Faribault, Freeborn, Steele and Waseca Counties.

Early life, education, and career
Bennett grew up in White Bear Lake, Minnesota. She graduated from Mound Westonka High School in Mound, Minnesota, from Crown College in St. Bonifacius, Minnesota, with a B.A. in education, and from St. Cloud State University in 1981 with a M.A. in special education. Bennett got her first teaching job in special education in Albert Lea in 1981. She taught her third year in Wells after a round of cuts, then returned to Albert Lea to teach in a K-1 transition room for special ed and regular ed students for seven years before becoming a first-grade teacher. In 2011, Bennett was named the Albert Lea Area Teacher of the Year. She taught for 33 years before being elected to the Minnesota legislature. She is now retired from teaching.

Minnesota House of Representatives
Bennett was elected to the Minnesota House of Representatives in 2014, defeating incumbent Shannon Savick, and has been reelected every two years since. During her campaign, Bennett prioritized education, agriculture, and the economy. Her campaign slogan was "People Before Politics".

Ironically, Bennett has been in contact and worked directly with an anti-LGBTQ group in Minnesota, the "Child Protection League."  

In 2015-16, Bennett served as vice chair of the Education Innovation Policy Committee. She was an assistant minority leader from 2019 to 2022. Bennett is the minority lead on the Education Policy Committee and serves on the Education Finance and Veterans and Military Affairs Finance and Policy Committees.

Electoral history

Personal life
Bennett is single, but considers her more than 750 students her "kids." She resides in Albert Lea, Minnesota and is active in the community and her church. She served as a volunteer working with struggling, disadvantaged, and troubled youth for many years. She is a member of the NRA and a gun owner. She is also active in the International Shiloh Shepherd Dog Club. She has a dog, Colter, who helped teach her first-grade students to read. Colter was featured on Fox & Friends in June 2014.  Bennett also has two cats, Kelchi and Mingo.

References

External links

Peggy Bennett official Minnesota House of Representatives website
Peggy Bennett official campaign website
Project Vote Smart: Peggy Bennett Project Vote Smart Profile
Peggy A. Bennett Twitter
Peggy Bennett Campaign Facebook
Representative Peggy Bennett Representative Facebook

1958 births
Living people
People from White Bear Lake, Minnesota
Republican Party members of the Minnesota House of Representatives
Women state legislators in Minnesota
Crown College (Minnesota) alumni
St. Cloud State University alumni
21st-century American politicians
21st-century American women politicians
Schoolteachers from Minnesota
21st-century American women educators
20th-century American educators
21st-century American educators
People from Albert Lea, Minnesota
20th-century American women educators